Daecheon Beach is a beach in Boryeong, South Korea. It is the biggest of South Korea's western beaches and stretches 3.5 km.

References 

Boryeong
Beaches of South Korea